"Wonder Drug" is a song by Australian rapper Allday, released on 9 November 2018 as the lead single from the Allday's third studio album Starry Night Over the Phone. The single was certified gold in Australia in 2021.

The song was co-written with Australian producers Max Byrne (aka Golden Vessel) and Simon Lam (of Kllo). Allday told Triple J, "I met Max through Mallrat, She knows everybody, we became pals and made some songs together." Additionally Lam, "did all the executive production because he has a similar sensibility to me to what sounds cool."

Track listing
Digital download
 "In Motion" – 3:15

Certifications

References

Allday songs
2018 songs
2018 singles
Songs written by Allday